The discography of Art of Noise, a British synthpop group, consists of five studio albums, 11 compilation albums, one extended play (EP) and 17 singles.

Albums

Studio albums

Compilation albums

Extended plays

Singles

Music videos

Notes

References

External links
 Official website
 Art of Noise at AllMusic
 
 

Discographies of British artists
Electronic music group discographies